"DJ Keep Playin' (Get Your Music On)" is the title of a top twenty dance single by Yvette Michele. Produced by Full Force the single spent twenty weeks on the US Billboard R&B singles chart.

The official music video for the song was directed by Brian Luvar; and it made the top twenty of the BET most-played music video chart.

Chart positions

References

1997 singles
Yvette Michele songs
Music videos directed by Brian Luvar
RCA Records singles
Song recordings produced by Full Force
1997 songs